Spiralizoros cervicornis is a species of insect in the order Zoraptera. It was first found in Malaysia.

This species was formerly a member of the genus Zorotypus.

References

External links

Zoraptera
Endemic fauna of Malaysia
Insects described in 2013
Insects of Malaysia